"To nie ja!" ("It wasn't me!"; often rendered without the exclamation mark) was the  entry in the Eurovision Song Contest 1994, performed in Polish by Edyta Górniak. This marked Poland's debut at the contest, and consequently the first time that the Polish language had been used in a contest entry. It was released as a single in English as "Once in a Lifetime".

The song is a dramatic ballad, with Górniak describing herself as having an "easy world" – seemingly one of easy distinctions between good and bad. She sings that she is not Eve, referring to the Biblical character, and asking for her listener not to blame her for the sins of that figure, and to accept her for who she really is.

Overview 
In 1984, composer Stanisław Syrewicz was in Chicago to demonstrate a composition to another composer named Pawel Oczątkowo, to be used by an American band upon the release of their album.

Ten years later, singer Edyta Górniak, while in London, contacted Jacek Cygan to write the lyrics to the music, that she had heard and had won her heart. She said that it should be understandable to people who do not know Polish. It was picked as first Polish representative at Eurovision.

At Eurovision 

's entry in the 2004 contest also placed second. At the same contest,  entrant Friderika, making her country's début with "Kinek mondjam el vétkeimet?" placed fourth, 

Górniak was threatened with disqualification after singing the second half of the song in English during the dress rehearsal watched by the national jury members. An English-language version was later recorded, titled "Once in a Lifetime", with lyrics by Graham Sacher.

The song was performed twenty-fourth on the night, following 's Youddiph with "Vyechniy stranik" and preceding 's Nina Morato with "Je suis un vrai garçon". At the close of voting, it had received 166 points, placing second in a field of twenty five.

It was succeeded as the Polish representative in the 1995 contest by Justyna with "Sama".

English version 

The English version "Once in a Lifetime" was released as Górniak's debut single and was featured on her debut album Dotyk. It features Górniak telling her lover that their relationship is a "once in a lifetime" event. The original Polish version also appears as the B-side of the single.

The single cover includes pictures by photographer Marlena Bielińska. The cover artwork was designed by Debi Ani Design Associates.

Music video 

Two videos were made, one for the Polish version and another for the English version. "To nie ja" starts with Górniak singing on a dark stage surrounded by smoke and blue light. Inserts of her singing in the recording studio occur throughout the video. For "Once in a Lifetime", Górniak wears yellow clothes in front of a white background, while the camera shows her from different perspectives.

Track listing 
 "Once in a Lifetime" (3:00)
 "To nie ja" (3:00)

Certifications

References 

Polish-language songs
1994 singles
Edel AG singles
Eurovision songs of Poland
Eurovision songs of 1994
1994 songs